Ryan David Lewis-Hillier is a Welsh footballer who plays as a forward for Cymru South club Abergavenny Town.

Career
Hillier is a product of the Newport County academy. On 4 September 2019 Hillier made his debut for Newport in the 5–4 defeat to West Ham United under-21s in the EFL Trophy Southern Group E as a substitute for Tristan Abrahams in the 22nd minute. Hillier scored the 4th goal for Newport in the 42nd minute. In June 2021 he signed his first professional contract with Newport County.

On 27 January 2021 Hillier joined Cardiff Metropolitan University on loan for the remainder of the 2021-22 season. He was released by Newport at the end of the 2021-22 season.

External links

References

Living people
Welsh footballers
Footballers from Newport, Wales
Association football forwards
Newport County A.F.C. players
2003 births
Cymru Premier players
Cardiff Metropolitan University F.C. players